is a fantasy role-playing video game developed and published by Square in 1988 for the Family Computer as the second installment of the Final Fantasy series. The game has received numerous enhanced remakes for the WonderSwan Color, the PlayStation, the Game Boy Advance, the PlayStation Portable, iOS, Android and Windows. As neither this game nor Final Fantasy III were initially released outside Japan, Final Fantasy IV was originally released in North America as Final Fantasy II, so as not to confuse players. Following enhanced versions for iOS and Android in 2010 and 2012 respectively, the game was re-released again as part of the 2021 Final Fantasy Pixel Remaster series.

The game's story centers on four youths whose parents were killed during an army invasion by the empire of Palamecia, who are using hellspawn to conquer the world. Three of the four main characters join a rebellion against the empire, embarking on missions to gain new magic and weapons, destroy enemy superweapons, and rescue leading members of the resistance. The Game Boy Advance remake adds a bonus story after the game is completed.

Final Fantasy II introduced many elements that would later become staples of the Final Fantasy franchise, including chocobos and the recurring character Cid. It also eliminated the traditional experience point leveling system of the previous and later games in the series, instead introducing an activity-based progression system where the characters' statistics increase according to how they are used or acquired. Despite being advertised as a sequel to Final Fantasy, the game includes no characters and locations from the first game. Final Fantasy II received little attention from non-Japanese reviewers at its initial release, though its remakes have garnered favorable reviews.

Gameplay
Final Fantasy II features gameplay similar to that of its predecessor, Final Fantasy. The player can freely roam an overworld containing several towns and dungeons. A menu-based system allows the player to outfit each character with equipment and up to two—often disposable—items for battle. Magic spells are assigned to the character from the item menu, and certain spells, such as "Cure", can be used outside of battle. The player can also save their progress on the overworld. Weapons, armor, items, and magic spells can be purchased at shops, and townspeople provide useful information for the player's progression through the game. One new feature is the "Word Memory" system: when in conversation with non-player characters (NPCs), the player can "ask" about and "memorize" special keywords or phrases, which can later be repeated to other NPCs to gain more information or unlock new actions. Similarly, there exist a handful of special items that can be shown to NPCs during conversation or used on certain objects, which have the same effect. Characters and monsters are no longer separated into separate windows in the battle screen as they were in the first Final Fantasy, and players can see their current and total hit points below the battle. Players can also fight with less than four characters in their party, which was not possible in the first game. Final Fantasy II introduced the chocobo, the signature Final Fantasy mascot, which lets characters ride to a location at great speed without being attacked by enemies. The recurring character Cid was also introduced, and a character of the same name has appeared in every main-series game since.

On the overworld and within dungeons, random encounters with enemies can be fought to improve each character's attributes. Unlike the original Final Fantasy, players cannot upgrade their characters' classes. The game is also one of the few games in the series to not use experience-based levels. Instead, each character participating in battle develops depending on what actions they take. For instance, characters who frequently use a particular type of weapon will become more adept at wielding a weapon of that type, and will also increase in physical strength and accuracy. Attributes include hit points, magic points, magic power, stamina, strength, spirit, agility, intelligence, and evasion. Hit points (HP) and magic points (MP) increase with their use; a character who takes a heavy amount of damage in a battle might earn an increase in maximum HP, while a character who uses a lot of MP during battle might increase their maximum MP. This experience system had several unintended consequences that allowed characters to gain much more experience than intended, such as players having their characters attack each other and repeatedly cast spells, thus causing their HP and abilities to grow extensively. Final Fantasy II uses the same turn-based battle system seen in the original Final Fantasy, with battle parties consisting of up to four characters at a time. The game introduces a "back row" in battle, within which characters or enemies are immune to most physical attacks, but can be harmed with bows and magical attacks.

Plot

Characters

Final Fantasy II features four playable characters as well as several secondary characters who are only briefly controlled by the player. Five playable characters temporarily join the party to assist Firion, Maria, and Guy in their missions for the rebellion.

Firion is voiced by Hikaru Midorikawa in the Japanese versions and by Johnny Yong Bosch in the English versions; Mateus is voiced by Kenyu Horiuchi in the Japanese versions and Christopher Corey Smith in the English versions. In the PlayStation's opening FMV of Final Fantasy II, Firion is also voiced by Yukimasa Obi, while Maria is played by Noriko Shitaya, Guy by Kenta Miyake, and Leon by Takayuki Yamaguchi.

Story
Final Fantasy II begins as Firion, Maria, Guy and Leon are attacked by Palamecian Black Knight soldiers and left for dead. Firion, Maria, and Guy are rescued by Princess Hilda, who has established a rebel base in the town of Altair after her kingdom of Fynn was invaded by the Emperor. Hilda denies their request to join the rebel army because they are too young and inexperienced. The three set off for Fynn in search of Leon; there they find a dying Prince Scott of Kashuan, Hilda's fiancé, who informs them that a former nobleman of Kashuan, Borghen, betrayed the rebellion and became a General in the Imperial army. The party returns to Altair to inform Hilda. She allows the group to join the rebellion and asks them to journey north to find mythril, a metal which could be used to create powerful weapons. The party makes its way north to the occupied village of Salamand, saves the villagers forced to work in the nearby mines, kills Borghen, and retrieves the mythril.

For their next mission, the party is sent to the city of Bafsk to prevent the construction of a large airship known as the Dreadnought; however, it takes off just as they arrive. After retrieving the Sunfire, a weapon which can blow up the Dreadnought, they watch helplessly as an airship with Hilda on board is captured by the Dreadnought. When the Dreadnought lands to stock up on supplies, the party rescues Hilda and throws the Sunfire into the airship's engine. Before escaping from the explosion, the party encounters a dark knight whom Maria thinks she recognizes as Leon.

On his deathbed, the King of Fynn tasks the party to seek the help of the seemingly extinct dragoons of Deist. In Deist, the party finds only a mother with her son, learning that all but one of the Dragoons are dead, partly as a result of Imperial poison. After placing an egg of the last wyvern in a cavern, the party returns to Altair and rescues Hilda from the Empire a second time, before successfully reclaiming Fynn from the Imperial forces. They then travel west in search of a powerful magic item, joining forces with the last surviving dragoon on the way. The party returns to Fynn and sees that many towns have been destroyed by a cyclone summoned by the Emperor. The party calls upon the newly born last wyvern to take them to a castle inside the cyclone, where they confront and kill the Emperor. Back at Fynn, everyone celebrates the Empire's defeat, but a mortally wounded Fynn soldier arrives and reveals that Leon has taken the throne and plans to destroy the Rebels with the Imperial army.

The party enters the castle of Palamecia and confronts Leon, but the Emperor reappears in the throne room in a new demonic form, revealing he has returned from Hell with the intention of destroying the entire world. The party and Leon escape Palamecia Castle with the wyvern, as the castle is replaced with the palace of Hell, Pandaemonium. Leon agrees to help the group seal the Emperor away. The party travels to the Jade Passage, an underground passage to the underworld, and finds the portal to Pandaemonium, where they finally defeat the Emperor. Afterwards, Leon chooses to leave in response to the trouble he caused, though Firion assures him that he'll be welcomed back if and when he returns.

Soul of Rebirth
The Dawn of Souls remake of the game for the Game Boy Advance includes an additional storyline that takes place after the game, which follows the four party members who died during the story of the game.

Following his sacrifice to unseal the door guarding the Ultima Tome, Minwu awakens in a new area and sees someone resembling Gordon fight off Imperial soldiers. Minwu assists him, and the man soon explains he is Scott, Gordon's brother. Minwu informs him of the events up to his own demise, and the two surmise they are in the Jade Passage since they both died. They find Josef and subsequently Ricard, eventually emerging in Machanon, a village in the mirror image of Poft where the citizens are dead victims of the Emperor's conquest, including Cid and Tobul, with the former asking the group to find out where they are and why they have been called here.

The four enter the teleporter at the north edge of town and enter what Minwu believes is Pandaemonium. Climbing to the highest floor, the party meets the Light Emperor, who explains that when Firion and his allies killed him, his soul was split, with the Emperor's "dark half" falling to Hell and acquiring more power, while his light half—the Emperor they now see—ascended to Heaven. He then explains they are in Arubboth, palace of Heaven, and the cave they traveled through was Raqia, the place where fallen angels are cast down to become demons, and that he called them here to ask for forgiveness on the behalf of his dark half, and offers them eternal life with him in Arubboth if they forgive his sins.

Though the four are tempted by the offer, apparitions of their loved ones show them a vision of Firion and his allies battling the Dark Emperor in Pandaemonium. Realizing this Emperor is just as evil as the original, the four reject his offer, and defeats the Light Emperor just as Firion and his allies vanquish the Dark Emperor. As the rebels in the world of the living celebrate their victory, the specters of Minwu, Scott, Josef and Ricard watch them and wish them well, and as they fade away into peaceful rest, Minwu comments that if anyone can change man's legacy of violence, it's Firion and his friends.

Development
During the development of the first installment in the series, Square's management decided to manufacture 400,000 copies of the game to make a sequel possible, then the original Famicom (NES) version successfully shipped 520,000 copies in Japan. As there were no concrete ideas for Final Fantasy II from the start, it was eventually taken in a new direction and included none of the previous game's characters or locations. Hironobu Sakaguchi, who had previously served as the main planner for Final Fantasy, assumed the role of director to accommodate for the larger development team. Using the experience gained from the first installment, which focused more on fitting story ideas into their new gameplay system and game world, the developers fully crafted the story of Final Fantasy II first. The gameplay was then built around the narrative. The experience system was designed to be a more realistic advancement system than that of the first game. Several members of the original staff from the first game reprised their jobs for Final Fantasy II. Sakaguchi again created the plot for the title, with the actual scenario written by Kenji Terada. Nobuo Uematsu composed the music, as he had for the first game, while Yoshitaka Amano was again the concept artist. As with the original, Final Fantasy II was programmed by Nasir Gebelli. Midway through the development of the game, Gebelli was forced to return to Sacramento, California from Japan due to an expired work visa. The rest of the development staff followed him to Sacramento with necessary materials and equipment and finished production of the game there. The game was released one day less than a year after the first game came out.

In April 1989, the game was novelized by its original scenario writer Kenji Terada under the title Final Fantasy II: Muma no Meikyū (lit. "The Labyrinth of Nightmares"). It was published in Japan exclusively by Kadokawa Shoten.

Music
The music for Final Fantasy II was later arranged by Tsuyoshi Sekito for the WonderSwan Color, PlayStation, and Game Boy Advance remakes. Although the two soundtracks were composed separately, the soundtrack to II has only been released as a combined album with the soundtrack to Final Fantasy I. They were first released as All Sounds of Final Fantasy I•II in 1989, which was then republished in 1994. An arranged album of music from the two soundtracks titled Symphonic Suite Final Fantasy was also released in 1989, while Final Fantasy & Final Fantasy II Original Soundtrack, a combined soundtrack album for the PlayStation versions of the games, was released in 2002 and re-released in 2004. The music of Final Fantasy II has also appeared in various official concerts and live albums, such as 20020220 music from Final Fantasy, a live recording of an orchestra performing music from the series including several pieces from the games. Additionally, several songs from the game were performed as part of a medley by the Royal Stockholm Philharmonic Orchestra for the Distant Worlds – Music from Final Fantasy concert tour, while a different medley of songs from the game were performed by the New Japan Philharmonic Orchestra in the Tour de Japon: Music from Final Fantasy concert series.

Versions and re-releases
Final Fantasy II has been remade several times for different platforms, and has frequently been packaged with the first Final Fantasy in various collections. While all of these remakes retain the same basic story and battle mechanics, various tweaks have been made in different areas, including graphics, sound, and specific game elements.

Unreleased English version
Following the successful North American release of the original Final Fantasy by Nintendo in 1990, Square Soft, Square's North American subsidiary, began work on an English language localization of Final Fantasy II, to be called Final Fantasy II: Dark Shadow Over Palakia. Assigned to the project was Kaoru Moriyama, whose later work included script translations for Final Fantasy IV and Secret of Mana (known as Seiken Densetsu 2 in Japan). Although a beta version was produced, and the game was advertised in several Square Soft trade publications, the long development time, the age of the original Japanese game and the arrival of the Super Nintendo Entertainment System, the NES's successor console, led Square Soft to cancel work on the Final Fantasy II localization in favor of the recently released Final Fantasy IV (which, to avoid confusing North American players, was retitled Final Fantasy II).

Although a prototype cartridge of the English NES Final Fantasy II was produced, the project was, by Moriyama's own admission, still far from complete: "We had so very limited memory capacity we could use for each game, and it was never really "translating" but chopping up the information and cramming them back in... [Additionally] our boss had no understanding in putting in extra work for the English version at that time". In 2003, when the game was finally released to English-speaking audiences as part of Final Fantasy Origins, it was released with new graphics, music, and a brand new translation under the supervision of Akira Kashiwagi. A fan translation of the original game was also created prior to the release of Origins, and makes use of an original translation as the existence of the prototype cartridge was not common knowledge at the time.

Re-releases
In addition to its original Famicom release, Final Fantasy II was re-released on the WonderSwan Color in 2001, and both singularly and as part of a collection with Final Fantasy I for the PlayStation in 2002. It was released on the Game Boy Advance in 2004 as part of Final Fantasy I & II: Dawn of Souls, on the PlayStation Portable in 2007, and for the Japanese Wii Virtual Console on June 16, 2009.

The Final Fantasy I•II collection included the original game with only minor changes. The WonderSwan Color remake of the game was first released on May 3, 2001, and later included as a bundle with a special Final Fantasy II edition of the console. It included completely redone graphics in the manner of the 16-bit generation Final Fantasy games and includes larger character sprites, remixed music by Tsuyoshi Sekito, and full graphical backgrounds in battle mode. The PlayStation version featured even more graphical updates over the WonderSwan version, and the soundtrack was again remixed by Tsuyoshi Sekito to a higher quality so as to utilise the audio capabilities of the PlayStation. Sekito also composed a few new tracks to be used in the new cutscenes. It was published both individually (in Japan only) and alongside Final Fantasy I in a collection entitled Final Fantasy Origins (or Final Fantasy I+II Premium Collection in Japan); this was the first release of the game outside Japan. The port was re-released as part of the Final Fantasy 25th Anniversary Ultimate Box package in December 2012.

Final Fantasy II was again released in a new format in 2004 for the Game Boy Advance as part of Final Fantasy I & II: Dawn of Souls. The primary change for this version was the addition of a bonus storyline entitled Soul of Rebirth accessible to the player after completing the game. In 2005 and 2006, Square Enix released a version of Final Fantasy II for three Japanese mobile phone networks. To celebrate the Final Fantasy series' 20th anniversary, the game was released in Japan for the PlayStation Portable in 2007. The remake features improved graphics, the cutscenes and soundtrack from Final Fantasy Origins, and the bonus quest and dungeons from Final Fantasy I & II: Dawn of Souls. It additionally includes four new dungeons in which more character-specific equipment can be found, alongside powerful enemies and two new bosses. The release for the Japanese Virtual Console  for the Wii on June 16, 2009, for the Wii U on December 11, 2013, and for the Nintendo 3DS on February 12, 2014, is identical to the original Famicom release, incorporating none of the updates of the later versions. On February 25, 2010, Square Enix released a port of the PSP version modified with touchscreen controls for the iOS platform.  Following this, a touchscreen port was brought to Android in 2012 through the Google Play store.

Reception

According to Square's publicity department, the original Famicom release sold 800,000 copies. As of March 31, 2003, the game, including all re-releases at the time, had shipped 1.28 million copies worldwide, with 1.08 million of those copies being shipped in Japan and 200,000 abroad. Despite having only been released in June of that year, as of September 2007 the PlayStation Portable version had shipped 90,000 copies in Japan and 70,000 in North America. Despite these high sales, the game had sold the fewest copies of any of the first ten main games in the Final Fantasy series.

Upon release, Famicom Tsūshin (now Famitsu) gave the original Famicom version a score of 35 out of 40, based on a panel of four reviewers giving it ratings of 9, 9, 9 and 8 out of 10. This made it one of their three highest-rated games of 1988, along with Dragon Quest III (which scored 38/40) and Super Mario Bros. 3 (which scored 35/40). It was also one of the magazine's five highest-rated games up until 1988, along with Dragon Quest II (which scored 38/40) and Zelda II: The Adventure of Link (which scored 36/40). The 1989 "All Soft Catalog" issue of Famicom Tsūshin included Final Fantasy II in its list of the best games of all time, giving it the Best Scenario award. Retrospectively, G4 described the stat-building system as an "Innovation", noting that "computer RPGs took the "level" system wholesale from tabletop role-playing games and made it a genre staple, but FF2 eliminated levels altogether", but that what "sounds novel at first wound up being a huge mess".

The game's re-releases have been more heavily reviewed. Famitsu magazine scored the WonderSwan version of the game a 30 out of 40, and GameSpot noted the Dawn of Souls mostly outdated graphics but praised its length and bonus content. IGN noted the great improvement in the translation of the story over Final Fantasy I and the addition of later Final Fantasy features, such as being able to save anywhere in the overworld map without a tent or cabin. The Dawn of Souls release was named the IGN Game Boy "Game of the Month" for March 2004, and the package was rated 76th in Nintendo Powers Top 200 Games list. The dialogue system was thought to be time consuming and stilted, but was still a milestone for interactivity. The story was considered to be much more involved and deep than the first Final Fantasy, as it involved romance and the death of characters. The game's plot was thought by some reviewers to mirror elements of Star Wars: A New Hope in its use of an orphan joining a rebellion against an empire that was building a massive ship, with a captive princess inside. GameSpy praised the addition of the ability to save the game at any time, calling the feature crucial for a game on a handheld game console, and in contrast to GameSpot, praised the graphics, saying that while they were primitive, they were "well-suited" to the Game Boy Advance.

The PSP version was met with generally average reviews. GameSpot described the "more intriguing" story and "key words" system as "notable" in "the evolution of the series and genre" but called the level up system "chaotic" and noted that unlike previous versions, this was shipped without a version of Final Fantasy I. IGN described the "dialogue and story" as "much more interesting than" its predecessor and the "proficiency system not unlike what's found in The Elder Scrolls" as a "semi-innovation" for its time, but also complained about the gameplay. Both sources praised the graphics, however. GameSpy, while echoing similar complaints about the "quirky and sometimes confusing" leveling system and praises for the graphics, also applauded the supposed decrease in difficulty of the game, which in the reviewers' opinion eliminated the necessity to abuse the leveling system in order to progress in the game as the player had to do in the original game.

See also
 List of Square Enix video game franchises

Further reading

Notes

References

External links
 

1988 video games
Android (operating system) games
Fiction about deicide
Final Fantasy video games
Game Boy Advance games
IOS games
Japanese role-playing video games
Nintendo Entertainment System games
PlayStation (console) games
PlayStation Network games
PlayStation Portable games
Fiction about rebellions
Single-player video games
Video games about the afterlife
Video games developed in Japan
Video games featuring female protagonists
Video games scored by Nobuo Uematsu
Video games set in hell
Virtual Console games
Virtual Console games for Wii U
Windows games
WonderSwan Color games